Los Santos may refer to:

Places
Los Santos, Santander, Colombia
Los Santos Zone, San José Province, Costa Rica
Los Santos Province, Panama
Los Santos District
La Villa de los Santos
Los Santos, Castile and León, Spain
Los Santos mine
Los Santos de la Humosa, Spain
Los Santos de Maimona, Spain

Other uses
Los Santos, a fictional setting in the video game series Grand Theft Auto

See also

Santos (disambiguation)
Santa (disambiguation)
Santo (disambiguation)